The Kazakhstan–China oil pipeline is China's  first direct oil import pipeline allowing oil import from Central Asia. It runs from Kazakhstan's Caspian shore to Xinjiang in China. The pipeline is owned by the China National Petroleum Corporation (CNPC) and the Kazakh oil company KazMunayGas.

History
The construction of pipeline was agreed between China and Kazakhstan in 1997. Kazakhstan proposed the pipeline, which became the first to run to China from any Central Asian country.

The first section of pipeline from the Aktobe region's oil fields to the Atyrau was completed in 2003. The construction of Kenkiyak–Kumkol section was agreed between Kazakhstan and China on 18 August 2007. This section was completed on 11 July 2009.

The pipeline was developed by the China National Petroleum Corporation (CNPC) and the Kazakh oil company KazMunayGas.

Currently capacity is at 14 million tons per year. The pipeline is expected to reach nominal capacity of 20 million tons per year in 2014.

Technical description
The pipeline was built and is operated by MunaiTas a joint venture between CNPC and KazMunayGas.

The Atasu-Alashankou section of the pipeline cost US$700 million. The pipeline includes an oil metering station at the Alataw Pass. The pipeline was built and is operated by a joint venture between CNODC and KazTrans Oil JSC. The first oil through this pipeline reached the refinery in August 2006.

It has initial transportation capacity of 10 million tons per year. This section has reached its full capacity in 2011.

Alashankou–Dushanzi Crude Oil Pipeline
The capacity of pipeline is 10 million tons of oil per year and it supplies mainly the Dushanzi refinery. The pipeline became operational on 21 December 2005 and the first oil through this pipeline reached to the refinery on 29 July 2006. The pipeline is constructed and operated by the China National Petroleum Corporation (CNPC).

Oil supplies
The Kazakhstan–China oil pipeline is supplied from the Aktobe region's fields and from the Kumkol oil field. In the future, the main supply source will be Kashagan field. The pipeline is used also for the transportation of oil from Russia's western Siberia by connection with the Omsk (Russia)–Pavlodar (Kazakhstan)–Shymkent–Türkmenabat (Turkmenistan) pipeline in Atasu oil terminal.  Oil is transported through this pipeline by Russian companies TNK-BP and Gazprom Neft.

See also

 Central Asia – China gas pipeline
 Eastern Siberia – Pacific Ocean oil pipeline
 Lanzhou–Zhengzhou–Changsha product oil pipeline

References

External links
Chow, Edward, "Central Asia’s Pipelines: Field of Dreams and Reality," in Pipeline Politics in Asia: The Intersection of Demand, Energy Markets, and Supply Routes (National Bureau of Asian Research, 2010)
 The Geopolitics of Oil Pipelines in Central Asia, Article on the Kazakhstan-China pipelines featured in Vestnik, the Journal of Russian and Asian Studies Winter 2007

Oil pipelines in Kazakhstan
Oil pipelines in China
Energy in Siberia
Energy in Central Asia
China–Kazakhstan relations